Paiyaa is the soundtrack to the 2010 Indian Tamil-language film of the same name, directed by N. Linguswamy and starring Karthi and Tamannaah. The soundtrack album originally includes five songs composed by Yuvan Shankar Raja and was released on 12 February 2010. The release coincided with a promotional event held at Sathyam Cinemas in Chennai, India.

The soundtrack album was marketed under the Chennai-based Think Music record label, which was founded in 2007, thus becoming their 50th album. During a press conference held by Think Music in mid-March 2010, it was announced that, thanks to the enormous success of the audio, an additional track has been composed by Yuvan Shankar Raja and included in the film at an appropriate place. The new CD including the new track, titled "Yedho Ondru", was released during the release of the film in early April. In 2011, Sony Music got the rights to the soundtrack.

Track listing

Reception

The album generally positive reviews and responses from critics and audiences alike. The songs got popular among the masses immediately, witnessing grand sales and making it very big in audio markets, due to which even the stocks of audio CDs got over soon. Becoming sensational hits very soon after its release, the songs were topping the Tamil music charts in the following weeks. The album has reportedly become 2010's biggest selling audio and the top selling ringtone as well. Moreover, as per the report of a national broadcasting agency, the song "Thuli Thuli" has become the first Tamil song to be featured in an all India index of the Top 20 songs on radio for the month of April 2010, indicating this song was played on all Indian FM radio stations more often than any other song in the history of Tamil film music ever. Yuvan Shankar Raja's songs as well as his film score were also often cited to be the biggest plus and the backbone of the film besides playing an important role for the film's success.

Awards

References

External links
 Paiyaa (soundtrack) at the Internet Movie Database

Yuvan Shankar Raja soundtracks
2010 soundtrack albums
Tamil film soundtracks